The Good Demons is a 2017 Cuban drama film directed by Gerardo Chijona from the screenplay written by Daniel Díaz Torres and based on the novel Algún demonio by Alejandro Hernández. It follows Tito, a 23 year old with a car and a secret. While his neighbors see him as a respectable, educated young man earning an income as a taxi driver, the reality is much more insidious. The film premiered at the 2017 International Festival of New Latin American Cinema in Havana.

Cast
 Carlos Enrique Almirante as Tito
 Vladimir Cruz as Rubén
 Enrique Molina as Molina
 Isabel Santos as Paquita 
 Yailene Sierra as Sara

Awards
At the 2018 Málaga Film Festival the film won awards for Best Supporting Actor, Best Screenplay, and Best Music, and was nominated for Best Iberoamerican Film.

References

External links
 
The Good Demons official site 

2017 films
2017 drama films
2010s Spanish-language films
Cuban drama films